Torikka is a Finnish surname.

Geographical distribution
As of 2014, 89.1% of all known bearers of the surname Torikka were residents of Finland (frequency 1:9,223), 7.6% of Sweden (1:193,074) and 1.6% of Canada (1:3,345,273).

In Finland, the frequency of the surname was higher than national average (1:9,223) in the following regions:
 1. South Karelia (1:2,743)
 2. Southwest Finland (1:3,830)
 3. Southern Savonia (1:4,615)
 4. Lapland (1:5,251)
 5. Päijänne Tavastia (1:5,734)
 6. Tavastia Proper (1:5,763)
 7. Kymenlaakso (1:6,836)

People
Elsa Torikka (born 1930), Finnish javelin thrower
Timo Torikka (born 1958), Finnish actor

References

Finnish-language surnames
Surnames of Finnish origin